Solva is a fly genus in the family Xylomyidae, the "wood soldier flies".

Species

Solva apicimacula Yang & Nagatomi, 1993
Solva atrata Daniels, 1977
Solva aurifrons James, 1939
Solva aurolimbata (Lindner, 1935)
Solva basalis Frey, 1960
Solva basiflava Yang & Nagatomi, 1993
Solva bergi James, 1951
Solva binghami Enderlein, 1921
Solva brasiliana (Lindner, 1949)
Solva cabrerae (Becker, 1908)
Solva caffra (Bigot, 1879)
Solva caiusi Séguy, 1956
Solva calopodata (Bigot, 1879)
Solva clavata Yang & Nagatomi, 1993
Solva completa (Meijere, 1914)
Solva concavifrons James, 1939
Solva confusa Hollis, 1962
Solva crepuscula Hull, 1944
Solva cylindricornis (Meijere, 1914)
Solva decora Webb, 1984
Solva devexifrons (Yang & Nagatomi, 1993)
Solva dorsiflava Yang & Nagatomi, 1993
Solva fascipennis (Meijere, 1919)
Solva flavicoxis (Enderlein, 1921)
Solva flavipes (Doleschall, 1858)
Solva flavipilosa Yang & Nagatomi, 1993
Solva flavoscutellaris (Matsumura, 1915)
Solva formosipes Frey, 1960
Solva furcicera Adisoemarto, 1973
Solva gracilifemur (Lindner, 1939)
Solva gracilipes Yang & Nagatomi, 1993
Solva harmandi Séguy, 1956
Solva hubensis Yang & Nagatomi, 1993
Solva hybotoides Walker, 1861
Solva ichneumonea (Frey, 1960)
Solva ichneumoniformis Enderlein, 1913
Solva illustris Frey, 1960
Solva inamoena Walker, 1859
Solva inconspicua (Brunetti, 1923)
Solva inornata Melander, 1949
Solva intermedia (Brunetti, 1923)
Solva japonica Frey, 1960
Solva javana (Meijere, 1907)
Solva javana var. floresensis Frey, 1934
Solva kambaitiensis Frey, 1960
Solva kinabalu Woodley, 2004
Solva kusigematii Yang & Nagatomi, 1993
Solva laeta Daniels, 1977
Solva longicornis Enderlein, 1913
Solva lugubris Szilády, 1941
Solva luzonensis (Enderlein, 1921)
Solva macroscelis (Speiser, 1923)
Solva maindroni Séguy, 1947
Solva maniema Speiser, 1923
Solva marginata (Meigen, 1820)
Solva mediomacula Yang & Nagatomi, 1993
Solva melanogaster Daniels, 1977
Solva mera Yang & Nagatomi, 1993
Solva micholitzi (Enderlein, 1921)
Solva montium Frey, 1960
Solva nana (Loew, 1850)
Solva nigra (Brunetti, 1923)
Solva nigricornis (Brunetti, 1920)
Solva nigricoxalis Adisoemarto, 1973
Solva nigricoxis Enderlein, 1921
Solva nigritibialis (Macquart, 1839)
Solva nigriventris (Brunetti, 1923)
Solva nigroscutata Meijere, 1916
Solva novaeguineae Lindner, 1938
Solva pallipes (Loew, 1863)
Solva palmensis Báez, 1988
Solva planifrons (Yang & Nagatomi, 1993)
Solva procera (Frey, 1960)
Solva pulchrina (Frey, 1960)
Solva rectitibia Frey, 1960
Solva remota Krivosheina, 1972
Solva richterae Krivosheina, 2015
Solva rufiventris (Bigot, 1879)
Solva schuitnikowi Pleske, 1928
Solva shanxiensis Yang & Nagatomi, 1993
Solva sikkimensis (Enderlein, 1921)
Solva similis (Brunetti, 1923)
Solva sinensis Yang & Nagatomi, 1993
Solva striata Yang & Nagatomi, 1993
Solva symata Séguy, 1948
Solva tamys Séguy, 1956
Solva thereviformis (Brunetti, 1920)
Solva tigrina Yang & Nagatomi, 1993
Solva tinctipes Meijere, 1919
Solva truncativena (Enderlein, 1913)
Solva tuberculata Webb, 1984
Solva tuberifrons (Yang & Nagatomi, 1993)
Solva uniflava Yang & Nagatomi, 1993
Solva varia (Meigen, 1820)
Solva varicolor (Bigot, 1891)
Solva verpa (Enderlein, 1921)
Solva vittata (Doleschall, 1858)
Solva yunnanensis Yang & Nagatomi, 1993

References

Xylomyidae
Brachycera genera
Taxa named by Francis Walker (entomologist)
Diptera of North America
Diptera of South America
Diptera of Australasia
Diptera of Europe
Diptera of Asia
Diptera of Africa